was a Japanese scientist, alpinist and technologist. He is also known as the captain of the primary Japanese Antarctica wintering party.

Nishibori was born in Kyoto in 1903. In May 1928, he graduated from the Faculty of Science, Kyoto Imperial University, and stayed on as a lecturer. In 1936, he received his graduate degree.

In October 1936, he moved to private enterprise, joining Toshiba, where he became the chief of the engineering division. He supervised the creation of an advanced vacuum tube named "Sora" in response to the Imperial Japanese Navy's request. Thereafter, he won the AIST prize.

After World War II, he served as an independent company consultant, and brought the technique of statistical quality control to the industrial world of Japan. Among various other prizes, he won the Deming Prize. His findings paved the way for the rapid industrial development of Japan after the war.

After returning to Kyoto University as a professor, he held the captaincy of the Japanese Antarctica wintering party, and the chairmanship of the Japan Mountaineering Association. Kinji Imanishi and Takeo Kuwabara were among Nishibori's mountain-climbing friends.

Nishibori also led negotiations with the Nepal government to send a Japanese expedition to climb Manaslu. It would become the first mountain above 8000 m in height to be first summoned by Japanese climbers.

Nishibori also backed the Japanese adventurer, Naomi Uemura, and taught him how to use scientific observation equipment, sextants, and other instruments.

Nishibori died in 1989.

1903 births
1990 deaths
People from Kyoto Prefecture
20th-century Japanese engineers
Japanese mountain climbers
Explorers of Antarctica
Kyoto University alumni
Academic staff of Kyoto University
Recipients of the Order of the Rising Sun, 3rd class